Livingroom Studios is a recording studio in Oslo, Norway.

Started in 1999 by producer/songwriter Espen Berg, Livingroom Studios is one of Norway's main music studio facilities.

The studio is home to the producer/songwriter team Espen Berg and Simen Eriksrud, as well as the mix engineer George Tandero.

Clients
The following are clients of Livingroom Studios:

Lady Gaga
Donkeyboy
Diana Vickers
Loreen

References

External links
LivingRoom Studios website

1999 establishments in Norway
Recording studios in Norway
Buildings and structures in Oslo
Music in Oslo